Ga Mone Pwint (GMP) is a Burmese conglomerate. Ga Mone Pwint is presently headed by Managing Director Nay Lynn Oo. The company runs major shopping centers in Yangon.

Stores 

 Myaynigone Ga Mone Pwint
 Bokalay Ga Mone Pwint
 Thein Gyi Zay Ga Mone Pwint
 Kaba Aye Ga Mone Pwint
 San Yeik Nyein Ga Mone Pwint
 Kan Taw Lay Ga Mone Pwint (under construction)

References

See also
City Mart Holdings
Sein Gay Har

Shopping malls and markets in Myanmar
Buildings and structures in Yangon Region
Retail companies of Myanmar
Holding companies established in 1991
Retail companies established in 1991
1991 establishments in Myanmar